Crane Nest (also known as Cranes Nest) is an unincorporated community located in Knox County, Kentucky, United States.

A post office was established in 1874.  According to tradition, the town gets its name from a rare crane's nest discovered in the area.

References

Unincorporated communities in Knox County, Kentucky
Unincorporated communities in Kentucky